Gigantostrea is an extinct genus of marine bivalve mollusks belonging to the family Gryphaeidae.

This genus is known in the fossil record from the Eocene to the Miocene (age range: from 48.6 to 15.97 million years ago). These fossils have been found in Europe and United States.

Description
These fossil shells are brittle, inequivalve, with the lower valve convex and the upper valve flat or slightly concave. The lower valve was cemented to the substrate.

Species
Species within this genus include:
 †Gigantostrea gigantica  Solander in Brander 1766
 †Gigantostrea trigonalis  Conrad 1854

References

External links
 Album-fossile

 
Eocene genus first appearances
Miocene genus extinctions
Prehistoric bivalve genera